Maryam is a Pakistani drama television series directed by Syed Ali Raza Usama, written by Kishore Asmal. It originally aired on Geo Entertainment and its major cast include Faysal Qureshi, Mawra Hocane, Alyy Khan, Uzma Gillani, and Kamran Jilani in the lead roles.

Cast
Faysal Qureshi
Mawra Hocane
Alyy Khan
Uzma Gillani as Firdous Begum
Kamran Jilani
Hammad Farooqui as Salman

References

External links 
 Official Website

2015 Pakistani television series debuts
2015 Pakistani television series endings
Geo TV original programming
Pakistani drama television series
Urdu-language television shows